Sedley is a surname, and may refer to:

Amelia Sedley, fictional character from the novel Vanity Fair by William Makepeace Thackeray
Catherine Sedley, Countess of Dorchester (1657–1717), mistress of King James II
Sir Charles Sedley, 2nd Baronet (1721–1778), British politician
Sir Charles Sedley, 5th Baronet (1639–1701), English wit, dramatist and politician, and Speaker of the House of Commons
David Sedley (born 1947), the seventh Laurence Professor of Ancient Philosophy at Cambridge University
Kate Sedley, the pen-name of Brenda Margaret Lilian Honeyman Clarke (born 1926), English historical novelist
Stephen Sedley, (born 1939), (The Rt. Hon. Lord Justice Sedley), a judge of the Court of Appeal of England and Wales
William Sedley, High Sheriff of Kent in 1547